The 1968–69 Australian region cyclone season was an above-average tropical cyclone season, featuring 15 tropical lows, of which 12 of them are named. Amber was the only hurricane-strength tropical cyclone of the season, however, it didn't affect any landmasses. It ran from 1 November 1968 to 30 April 1969, with the regional tropical cyclone operational plan defining a "tropical cyclone year" separately from a "tropical cyclone season", with the "tropical cyclone year" for this season lasting from 1 July 1968 to 30 June 1969.

Season summary

Systems

Tropical Cyclone Adele

On November 22, a tropical depression formed near Papua New Guinea and moved to the southwest. It failed to strengthen until the 27th of November when it briefly reached tropical storm status and was named Adele. The storm then weakened and dissipated the next day.

Tropical Cyclone Amber

On December 19, a tropical low developed to the southwest of Jakarta. It further strengthened to a tropical cyclone, earning the name Amber. It briefly reached Category 1-equivalent hurricane before weakening. It was last noted on December 22.

Tropical Cyclone Beatie

Beati was a weak tropical cyclone that originated to the south of Java. It moved westward, passing to the south of Christmas Island. It remained weak until it dissipated on December 24.

Tropical Cyclone Bettina-Berthe

A tropical low to the west of Cocos Islands strengthened to Tropical Cyclone Bettina. However, it exited the basin towards the South-West Indian Ocean basin, early the next day.

Tropical Cyclone Cheri

Cheri was first noted on December 27 forming to the west of Christmas Island. It briefly strengthened to a Category 1 tropical cyclone before it was last noted dissipating on December 30.

Tropical Cyclone Bridget

Another weak cyclone, Bridget was seen developing to the south of Papua New Guinea. It moved to the south before it was last noted to the north of Townsville.

Tropical Cyclone Colleen

A tropical low was noted forming near the Solomon Islands on January 27. It failed to develop and moved into the South Pacific basin, where it was named Coleen before striking New Caledonia. It entered the basin again on February 4; however, it wasn't renamed. It reexited the region, the next day, shortly before transitioning to an extratropical cyclone.

Tropical Cyclone Gladys

Gladys formed over Western Australia, to the south-southwest of Derby. It moved offshore on the same day and moved to the west before it was last noted dissipating to the north-northwest of Exmouth.

Tropical Cyclone Irene

The weakening Irene from the South Pacific basin entered the region on February 21. The storm weakened as it executed a loop before it was last noted on February 24 to the east of Cairns.

Tropical Cyclone Audrey-Bonnie

A tropical low developed to become Tropical Cyclone Audrey on March 1. However, it made landfall near Maningrida on March 3. It weakened inland as it moved southwestward; however, it regenerated to a tropical cyclone to the northwest of Broome, with the BoM renaming the system Bonnie. It weakened again as it moved further inland, and it was last noted on March 9.

Tropical Cyclone Leonie

Leonie developed to the north of Cocos Islands. Moving southward, the cyclone slowly weakened and transitioned to an extratropical storm before it was last noted inland,  to the south of Jingalup.

Tropical Cyclone Esther

The last named tropical cyclone of the season, Esther formed to the east of Port Moresby on April 25. The system then performed a loop before exiting the basin on April 30. Formed east of Papua New Guinea, executed a loop, and moved eastward into the South Pacific basin.

Other systems
A tropical depression formed on December 16 and later moved into the neighboring South-West Indian Ocean, becoming Cyclone Amber.

Tropical Cyclone Enid formed on the extreme western portion of the basin on an unknown date; it later moved on the South-West Indian Ocean basin and was renamed Fanny.

There were two storms in April that exited off the northeast coast of Australia. The first one developed on April 8 to the southwest of Honiara, Solomon Islands. It moved to the northwest, then turned to the southwest, before it was last noted on April 15, midway between Queensland and New Caledonia. The second one formed on April 11 near the island nation and was last seen to the south-southwest of Brisbane on April 16.

Season effects

See also

Australian region tropical cyclone
List of Southern Hemisphere tropical cyclone seasons
 Atlantic hurricane seasons: 1968, 1969 
 Eastern Pacific hurricane seasons: 1968, 1969 
 Western Pacific typhoon seasons: 1968, 1969
North Indian Ocean cyclone seasons: 1968, 1969
1968–69 South-West Indian Ocean cyclone season
1968–69 South Pacific cyclone season

References

Australian region cyclone seasons
 disasters in Australia
 disasters in Australia
 disasters in Oceania
 disasters in Oceania